Pultenaea villifera is a species of flowering plant in the family Fabaceae and is endemic to two disjunct areas of Australia. It is an erect to prostrate shrub with triangular to linear, egg-shaped to elliptic leaves and yellow and red, pea-like flowers.

Description
There are two varieties of Pultenaea villifera - var. villifera that is endemic to New South Wales and var. glabrescens that is endemic to Kangaroo Island in South Australia.

Pultenaea villifera var. villifera 

Pultenaea villifera var. glabrescens 

Taxonomy
Pultenaea villifera was first formally described in 1825 by Augustin Pyramus de Candolle in Prodromus Systematis Naturalis Regni Vegetabilis from an unpublished description by Franz Sieber.

In 1923, John McConnell Black described two varieties in Transactions and proceedings of the Royal Society of South Australia and the names are accepted by the Australian Plant Census:
 Pultenaea villifera var. glabrescens J.M.Black
 Pultenaea villifera Sieber ex DC. var. villifera

Distribution and habitat
Pultenaea villifera var. glabrescens in endemic to the north coast of Kangaroo Island where it grows in woodland, heath and grassland and var. villifera grows in forest in New South Wales between the lower Blue Mountains and Eden.

References

Fabales of Australia
Flora of New South Wales
Flora of South Australia
villifera
Plants described in 1825
Taxa named by Augustin Pyramus de Candolle